Acetivibrio alkalicellulosi  is an obligately alkaliphilic and anaerobic bacterium from the genus Acetivibrio which has been isolated from sediments of the Beloe soda lake from Buryatiya in Russia.

References

 

Bacteria described in 2006
Oscillospiraceae